Godil Prasad Anuragi (5 November 1928 – 19 September 2021) was an Indian politician. He was elected to the Lok Sabha, lower house of the Parliament of India as a member of the Indian National Congress.

References

External links
Official biographical sketch in Parliament of India website

1928 births
2021 deaths
India MPs 1980–1984
Lok Sabha members from Madhya Pradesh
Indian National Congress politicians
Indian National Congress politicians from Madhya Pradesh